"Je ne vous oublie pas" (in English "I Won't Forget You") is the lead single from Celine Dion's French-language greatest hits album, entitled On ne change pas (2005). It was released as a music download in Canada on 27 September 2005 and in France on 3 October 2005. The CD single was released in France, Belgium and Switzerland in mid-October 2005. "Je ne vous oublie pas" reached number two in France and was certified Gold there.

Background and release
The lyrics, by Jacques Veneruso, who worked with Dion on her previous French album, 1 fille & 4 types, say that the song is a dedication to all Dion's fans, a declaration of love. Veneruso wrote and produced also four tracks for Dion's next French album D'elles, as well as the lead single from Sans attendre.

The music video was filmed and directed by Didier Kerbrat in Montreal's Imperial Theatre in July 2005, and released in September 2005.

Dion visited France in October 2005 to promote her new album and performed "Je ne vous oublie pas" in various TV shows. The single reached there number 2 and was certified gold (200,000 copies sold). It was also successful in other countries, reaching number 2 in Quebec, number 4 in Belgium Wallonia and number 21 in Switzerland.

"Je ne vous oublie pas" was nominated for a 2006 Félix Award in Best Song of the Year category.

The version of "Je ne vous oublie pas" performed by Dion and Les 500 Choristes was released in November 2006, on their album 500 Choristes avec.../vol.2. It was later included on Dion's 2007 single "Et s'il n'en restait qu'une (je serais celle-là)."

In 2013, Dion performed a capella snippets of the song both as an introduction and as an outro for her Sans attendre Tour concerts.

Track listing and formats
 European CD single
 "Je ne vous oublie pas" – 3:35
 "Sous le vent" (with Garou and Les 500 Choristes) – 3:34
 "Je ne vous oublie pas" (Instrumental Version) – 3:35

Charts

Weekly charts

Year-end charts

Certifications and sales

Release history

References

Celine Dion songs
2005 singles
French-language songs
Pop ballads
Songs written by Jacques Veneruso
2005 songs